Zaporozhets is a village (a selo) in the Zaporizhzhia Raion (district) of Zaporizhzhia Oblast in southern Ukraine. Its population was 182 in the 2001 Ukrainian Census. Administratively, it belongs to the Hryhorivka Rural Council, a local government area.

The settlement was founded in 1922 as a khutir (a type of rural locality); in 1965, Zaporozhets was granted the status of a village.

References

Populated places established in 1965
Populated places established in the Ukrainian Soviet Socialist Republic

Zaporizhzhia Raion
Villages in Zaporizhzhia Raion